Sérgio Ribeiro (born 21 December 1935) is a Portuguese politician. He was formerly a Member of the European Parliament (MEP) for the Portuguese Communist Party (part of the European United Left–Nordic Green Left group), having been elected in the 2004 election, but was replaced on 13 January 2005 by Pedro Guerreiro, of the same party.

References

1935 births
Living people
Portuguese anti-fascists
Portuguese Communist Party politicians
Portuguese Communist Party MEPs
MEPs for Portugal 2004–2009